Linda Carter is a fictional character from the British soap opera EastEnders

Linda Carter or Lynda Carter may also refer to:

Linda S. Carter, American politician
Linda Carter Brinson (born 1948), American journalist
Lynda Carter (born 1951), American actress and singer